The Illinois Legislative Latino Caucus (ILLC), also known as the Illinois Latinx Caucus, is a bloc of state legislators in the Illinois General Assembly, composed of legislators of Latino heritage. As of the 102nd General Assembly, the ILLC has 15 members across the Illinois House of Representatives and Illinois Senate.

About

The primary mission of the Illinois Legislative Latino Caucus is to empower Illinois Latinos and assure equitable representation in the General Assembly and promote legislative action directed to address those interests.

Specific caucus priorities include:
Increasing access to resources that benefit Latinos in Illinois
Forming and sustaining partnerships with businesses and organizations to enhance opportunities for Latinos in Illinois
Supporting the widespread distribution of information on public policy that impact Latinos in Illinois
Providing resources for young Latinos in Illinois to succeed in education

Since 2002, the ILLCF has provided college bound students across the state with scholarships. The ILLCF college scholarship has granted close to $1,000,000 to more than 500 students in Illinois.

Membership

Current House members 
, the 102nd General Assembly of the Illinois House of Representatives consists of the following members:

Ɨ Legislator was appointed to the Illinois House of Representatives during session.

Current Senate members 
, the 102nd General Assembly of the Illinois Senate consists of the following members:

 Ɨ Legislator was appointed to the Illinois Senate during session.

References

External links
Illinois Legislative Latino Caucus Foundation official website
Illinois House Democrats - Latino Caucus Press Releases

See also 

 Illinois Legislative Black Caucus
 Chicago City Council Latino Caucus

Illinois General Assembly
Issue-based groups of legislators
Hispanic and Latino American culture in Chicago
Politics_of_Illinois